Soldier 2 Soldier is a collaborative studio album by rappers stic.man and Young Noble. It was released on October 3, 2006.

In early 2006, the political, sometimes militant, Dead Prez member stic.man and Outlawz's Young Noble collaborated to make Soldier 2 Soldier. The relationship between the two groups worked well enough that they decided to work on another record, as Dead Prez and Outlawz,  ; Can't Sell Dope Forever. The theme of war is prevalent throughout the album, which opens and closes with a "Soldiers Prayer," but it is directed towards the struggles in the U.S., as opposed to those abroad.

Track listing

References

External links 
 

2006 albums
Stic.man albums
Young Noble albums
Real Talk Entertainment albums
Albums produced by Big Hollis
Collaborative albums